The following is a list of MTV Asia Awards winners for Favorite Artist Hong Kong.

MTV Asia Awards